Rugby league in the Netherlands is a minor sport played by five clubs.

History

Introduction

The first steps of introducing Rugby League in the Netherlands were made in 1989 during the preparation for and the participation at the Tertiary Student Rugby League World Cup. The Dutch, along with the Irish, were very much the fledglings of that competition. The Netherlands Amateur Rugby League itself was in that year less than a year old, having been established only in November 1988 with Hans Modderman as its first president.

A good deal had however been achieved in that short period and the Dutch were particularly grateful to the intensive coaching session's conducted by Tas Baitieri, Ian Harris, Phil Larder and Fred Lindop. The Dutch students were mainly first division rugby union players but keen and enthusiastic, if a little apprehensive, about their participation in the World Cup. As part of their build up to the tournament, they played against the French Army at the Royal Military Academy in Breda, which was the first rugby league match in the Netherlands and must be one of the few matches in those days played between two non-English speaking nations. In this inaugural match, Toon Boersma scored both tries for the Netherlands.

The team was made up of
Toine van der Bert (Utrecht Students),
Toon Boersma (Leiden Students),
Pim Bogaers (Amsterdam Students),
Fred Bos (Amsterdam Students),
Gerard van Brakel (Amsterdam Students),
Garry Corthals (Delft Students),
Lon Cramers (Royal Military Academy),
Hans Dinkla (RC Dwingeloo),
Karel Dinkla (RC Dwingeloo),
Michiel van Dijk (Utrecht Students),
Paul Heiden (Amsterdam Students),
Fred Housheer (Utrecht Students),
Remco Klasen (Groningen Students),
Paul Hengeveld (ARC-NFC Amstelveen),
Nick Veenstra (Amsterdam Students),
Bob Voorbraak (Amsterdam Students),
Daan Sistermans (Groningen Students),
Chatib Sjarbaini (Amsterdam Students),
Joost Taaken (Amsterdam Students),
Theo Voogd (Utrecht Students),
Johan Vos (Groningen Students) and 
Eric Warmoltz (Groningen Students).

The World Cup 1989 was held in York and including eight teams: the four Home Nations plus Australia, New Zealand, France and of course the Netherlands. In the group games the Dutch were defeated by Wales (10-48), France (12-42) and New Zealand (16-50). The Cup seventh vs eight final was left in which Scotland defeated the Netherlands (10-20).

After that tournament there was a follow-up in November 1989 in Toulouse (France). The Dutch were invited to play a match against Toulouse Olympique which ended in an admirable draw (20-20).

NNRLB era

Unfortunately it took till 2003 before the next game took place when two Netherlands sides hosted two national touring sides from Scotland. The first 13-a-side club game of Rugby League was also played in 2003 with Den Haag side Te Werve hosting Essex Eels.  Also during 2003 a South Holland representative side played in the York 9's.

Their first entry into major competitions was in 2005 when the Netherlands entered the Rugby League European Nations Cup for the first time, losing to Georgia 34–14 but beating Serbia 26–10.

The Netherlands competed in the 2008 Rugby League World Cup qualifying competition alongside Russia, Georgia and Serbia.  The team lost to Russia and Georgia before beating Serbia to come third in the group.  The third-place finish was not enough to see the Netherlands progress in the competition.

NRLB era
The Netherlands Rugby League Bond (NRLB) was formed in 2009 and hosted rugby league nines tournaments periodically. The NRLB became a Rugby League European Federation observer member in February 2012. The Amsterdam Cobras and Rotterdam Pitbulls played a two-match friendly series in 2014.

The first full competition was held in 2015. It consisted of three Dutch clubs and Belgian club, North Brussels Gorillas, who won the grand final. This was North Brussels only season competing in the Dutch competition.

The NRLB obtained affiliate membership of the RLEF in June 2017.

Competitions

As of 2021, the NRLB competition was last contested by four clubs. The Zwolle Wolves were set to join in 2020, but the competition was cancelled due to the COVID-19 pandemic.

See also

 Netherlands Rugby League Bond
 Netherlands national rugby league team
 Dutch Rugby League Competition

References

External links